Franck Dépine (born 11 April 1959) is a French former cyclist. He competed in the sprint event at the 1984 Summer Olympics.

References

External links
 

1959 births
Living people
French male cyclists
Olympic cyclists of France
Cyclists at the 1984 Summer Olympics
Cyclists from Lyon